In enzymology, a 3-oxoacyl-[acyl-carrier-protein] reductase is an enzyme that catalyzes the chemical reaction

3-oxoacyl-[acyl-carrier-protein](ACP) + NADPH + H+  (3R)-3-hydroxyacyl-[acyl-carrier-protein](ACP) + NADP+ 

This enzyme belongs to the family of oxidoreductases, specifically those acting on the CH-OH group as hydride donor with NAD+ or NADP+ as hydride acceptor. The systematic name of this enzyme class is (3R)-3-hydroxyacyl-[acyl-carrier-protein]:NADP+ oxidoreductase. Other names in common use include beta-ketoacyl-[acyl-carrier protein](ACP) reductase, beta-ketoacyl acyl carrier protein (ACP) reductase, beta-ketoacyl reductase, beta-ketoacyl thioester reductase, beta-ketoacyl-ACP reductase, beta-ketoacyl-acyl carrier protein reductase, 3-ketoacyl acyl carrier protein reductase, 3-ketoacyl ACP reductase, NADPH-specific 3-oxoacyl-[acylcarrier protein]reductase, and 3-oxoacyl-[ACP]reductase. This enzyme participates in fatty acid biosynthesis and polyunsaturated fatty acid biosynthesis.

Structural studies

References

 
 
 

EC 1.1.1
NADPH-dependent enzymes
Enzymes of known structure